QuetzSat 1 is a Mexican high-power geostationary communications satellite which is operated by the Mexican operator QuetzSat (a joint venture of SES S. A., formerly in its full name Société Européenne des Satellites, of Luxembourg, and Grupo Medcom of Mexico, of the Serna family)  It is positioned in geostationary orbit, and located at 77° West, from where it provide direct broadcasting services to United States and a part of Mexico for Dish Mexico.

QuetzSat 1 was built by Space Systems/Loral, and is based on the LS-1300 satellite bus. It has a design life of fifteen years. QuetzSat 1 is part of the SES satellite fleet.

Launch 
QuetzSat 1 was launched by International Launch Services using a Proton-M carrier rocket with a Briz-M upper stage from site 200 of the Baikonur Cosmodrome in Kazakhstan, at 18:32 UTC on 29 September 2011. The launch successfully placed QuetzSat 1 into a geosynchronous transfer orbit, making it the 49th comsat of the SES S. A. satellite fleet.

Technical specs 
Operator: QuetzSat
Manufacturer: Space Systems/Loral
Purpose: Direct-broadcast satellite
Orbital location: 77° West
Payload: 32 Ku band transponder
Platform: LS-1300S (expanded)
Mass: 5,514 kg
Spacecraft propulsion: Aerojet R-4D, 4 plasma thrusters SPT-100
Stabilisation: 3 axis
Lifetime: 15 years
Also known as: 37826

See also 

Dish Network
Echostar

References

External links 
QuetzSat.com 
InternationalLaunchServices.com
Broadcast of the launch of QuetzSat 1 (Windows and Flash)

SES satellites
Spacecraft launched in 2011
Satellites orbiting Earth
Communications satellites in geostationary orbit
Satellites using the SSL 1300 bus